L 168-9 (also known as GJ 4332 or TOI-134) is a red dwarf star located  away from the Solar System in the constellation of Tucana. The star has about 62% the mass and 60% the radius of the Sun. L 168-9 is orbited by one known exoplanet.

Planetary system 

The exoplanet L 168-9 b was discovered in 2020 using TESS. L 168-9 b is a target for observation and atmospheric characterization with the James Webb Space Telescope, and has been observed as one of its first targets.

In August 2022, this planetary system was included among 20 systems to be named by the third NameExoWorlds project.

References 

Tucana (constellation)
M-type main-sequence stars
Planetary systems with one confirmed planet
CD-60 08051
4332
115211
0134